STS-45 was a 1992 NASA Space Shuttle mission using the . Its almost nine-day scientific mission was with a non-deployable payload of instruments. It was the 46th Space Shuttle mission and the 11th for Atlantis.

Crew

Backup crew

Crew seating arrangements

Mission highlights 
Atlantis was launched on March 24, 1992, at 8:13 a.m. EST. The launch was originally scheduled for March 23, 1992, but was delayed by one day because of higher-than-allowable concentrations of liquid hydrogen and liquid oxygen in the orbiter's aft compartment during tanking operations. During troubleshooting, the leaks could not be reproduced, leading engineers to believe that they were the result of plumbing in the main propulsion system not thermally conditioned to the cryogenic propellants; the launch was rescheduled for March 24, 1992.

STS-45 carried the first Atmospheric Laboratory for Applications and Science (ATLAS-1) experiments, placed on Spacelab pallets mounted in the orbiter's payload bay. The non-deployable payload, equipped with 12 instruments from the United States, France, Germany, Belgium, Switzerland, the Netherlands and Japan, conducted studies in atmospheric chemistry, solar radiation, space plasma physics and ultraviolet astronomy. ATLAS-1 instruments included the Atmospheric Trace Molecule Spectroscopy (ATMOS); Grille Spectrometer; Millimeter Wave Atmospheric Sounder (MAS); Imaging Spectrometric Observatory (ISO); Atmospheric Lyman-Alpha Emissions (ALAE); Atmospheric Emissions Photometric Imager (AEPI); Space Experiments with Particle Accelerators (SEPAC); Active Cavity Radiometer (ACR); Measurement of Solar Constant (SOLCON); Solar Spectrum; Solar Ultraviolet Spectral Irradiance Monitor (SUSIM); and Far Ultraviolet Space Telescope (FAUST). Other payloads included the Shuttle Solar Backscatter Ultraviolet (SSBUV) experiment, a Get Away Special (GAS) experiment and six mid-deck experiments.

The mission was extended by a day in order to continue science experiments. The landing occurred on April 2, 1992, 6:23 a.m. EST, on Runway 33 of the Shuttle Landing Facility, located at the Kennedy Space Center.

Mission insignia
The mission insignia covers all aspects of the flight, by featuring Earth and the Sun, and the orbiter on high inclination, as to illustrate the high importance of the mission. The names of all flying members are included in the band, separated by stars. In the 'ring' at the bottom right, a single star is included, separating the unmentioned names of the alternate mission specialists, who are therefore indirectly included; a first and unique tribute to a support crew. Dirk Frimout is the first Belgian citizen to fly into space, and the only one to fly on a Space Shuttle (the other is Frank De Winne (who flies to the International Space Station via Soyuz as mission commander), as the Space Shuttle program was terminated at the time of the latter's flight), but to keep the focus on the mission, no national flag is added nor the customary logo of the European Space Agency (ESA), but the mission main objective, ATLAS, is included below instead.

See also 

 List of human spaceflights
 List of Space Shuttle missions
 Nikon NASA F4
 Outline of space science
 Space Shuttle

References

External links 
 STS-45 Video Highlights 
 NASA mission summary 

Space Shuttle missions
Spacecraft launched in 1992